William Sterling may refer to:

 William T. Sterling (1808–1903), American politician and pioneer from Wisconsin
 William Sterling (director), Australian producer and director
 William E. Sterling (1927–2005), suffragan bishop of the Episcopal Diocese of Texas

See also 
 William Stirling (disambiguation)